Aktiespararen (Swedish: the Shareholder) is a Swedish language monthly business magazine based in Stockholm, Sweden. It is the official organ of the Swedish Shareholders' Association.

History and profile
Aktiespararen was established in 1967. The magazine is owned by the Swedish Shareholders' Association. Based in Stockholm, it is published on a monthly basis. It offers articles concerning the Swedish market for equities, mutual funds and other securities. The magazine publishes financial analyses about Swedish companies.

References

External links
Official website

1967 establishments in Sweden
Business magazines published in Sweden
Magazines established in 1967
Magazines published in Stockholm
Monthly magazines published in Sweden
Professional and trade magazines
Swedish-language magazines